No Trespassing is a 1986 EP by the American folk group the Roches. It was released in 1986 on SOS Records, and distributed more widely by Rhino Records.

Production
The EP was produced by Joe Ferry, Andy Block, and the Roches. The trio recorded it after splitting from Warner Bros. Records; they claimed that it was the first time that they had total control in the studio.

Critical reception
The New York Times determined that "as usual with the Roches, [the EP] finds new things to say about love and its discontents—quietly but without flinching." The Los Angeles Times praised the "enticing, soft-rockish title song."

AllMusic wrote that "an alternately gleeful and wary romanticism empowers the whole set, as the Roches sisters' voices entwine as one, with novel harmonies adding cycles of tension and resolution."

Track listing
 "No Trespassing"
 "Knifed"
 "That Won't Happen"
 "La Vie C'est La Vie"

Credits
 Produced by Joe Ferry, Andy Bloch and the Roches
 Engineered by Andy Bloch
 Recorded at Acme Studios, Mamaroneck, N.Y.
 Digital remastering: Bill Inglot and Ken Perry / A&M Mastering
 Front and back cover design: Terre Roche & Rise Daniels

References

1986 EPs
The Roches albums
Rhino Records EPs